The 1989 International ADAC Trophäe was the fifth round of the 1989 World Sports Prototype Championship. It took place at the Nürburgring, West Germany on August 20, 1989.

Official results
Class winners in bold. Cars failing to complete 75% of winner's distance marked as Not Classified (NC).

Statistics
 Pole position - #62 Team Sauber Mercedes - 1:23.125
 Fastest lap - #61 Team Sauber Mercedes - 1:29.281
 Average speed - 172.725 km/h

References

 
 

Nurburgring
Nurburgring
6 Hours of Nürburgring